Oddlaug Vereide (10 April 1933 – 4 August 2021) was a Norwegian politician for the Christian Democratic Party. She was elected deputy representative and met regularly in the Storting in 1989 and 1990.

Political career
Vereide was elected deputy representative to the Storting from the constituency of Sogn og Fjordane for the period 1989–1994, for the Christian Democratic Party.

She was a member of the municipal council of Gloppen from 1979 to 1995. She was board member of several local organizations, and was board member of the Sogn og Fjordane chapter of the Christian Democratic Party.

Personal life
Vereide was born in Gloppen on 10 April 1933, a daughter of farmers  and Maria O. Solheim.

She died on 4 August 2021.

References

1933 births
2021 deaths
People from Gloppen
Sogn og Fjordane politicians
Christian Democratic Party (Norway) politicians
Members of the Storting
Norwegian women in politics
Women members of the Storting